Kenneth E. Killoren (1919-1988) was a Jesuit priest who lived in Korea and the first president of Sogang College.

He came to Korea in 1955 with Arthur Dethlefs, another Jesuit priest from Wisconsin. Killoren became the first president Sogang College in February 1960. He was also a contributing writer to the Korea Journal. He was the first naturalized citizen of Korea.

See also
 Jesuit
 Sogang University

References

20th-century American Jesuits
1919 births
1988 deaths
South Korean religious leaders